Horn is a locality situated in Kinda Municipality, Östergötland County, Sweden with 495 inhabitants in 2010.

Climate
Horn has a hybrid climate between continental and maritime tendencies. It is influenced by its interior position in a spot prone to air frosts and high diurnal temperature variation. As a result, frosts are possible in all months of the year, even though monthly average highs are above freezing year-round. Horn has not had its station operating longer than 1995, although has since been established as the coldest climate with a weather station in the wider Southern Sweden region of Götaland.

References 

Kinda Municipality
Populated places in Östergötland County
Populated places in Kinda Municipality